The Monitor (also briefly known as the West End Chronicle) was an English-language online newspaper based in Montreal, Quebec, Canada.

Formerly a weekly newspaper serving the West End Montreal communities of Notre-Dame-de-Grâce, Hampstead, Côte Saint-Luc and Montreal West, it published its final print edition on February 5, 2009. Launched in 1926, the paper was bought by Transcontinental in 1996. It had a circulation of 35,000.

In order to cut costs, Transcontinental had reduced staff and attempted to share content and design with its other publications, even briefly renaming the Monitor the West End Chronicle, after its West Island Chronicle.

See also
List of newspapers in Canada

References

External links
The Monitor news site

1926 establishments in Quebec
2009 disestablishments in Quebec
Defunct newspapers published in Quebec
Defunct weekly newspapers
Canadian news websites
English-language newspapers published in Quebec
Newspapers published in Montreal
Publications established in 1926
Publications disestablished in 2009
Online newspapers with defunct print editions
Weekly newspapers published in Quebec